This is a list of the Croatia national football team results from 1940 in Yugoslavia up to the country's independence in 1991.

The 1940s matches include four played by the Banovina of Croatia and another fifteen by the Independent State of Croatia. Then, the Socialist Republic of Croatia played a 1956 match against Indonesia.

In the modern era, the nation played three friendly matches under its new name, the Republic of Croatia, shortly before its independence from Yugoslavia, the first being against the United States in 1990.

Key 

All matches listed are friendlies. Numbered matches are recognised by FIFA, while non-numbered matches are recognised by the Croatian Football Federation and/or the other team's governing body but not by FIFA.

Match outcomes

1940s–1950s

1940: Banovina of Croatia

1941: Independent State of Croatia

1942: Independent State of Croatia

1943: Independent State of Croatia

1944: Independent State of Croatia

1945: Federal State of Croatia

1956: Socialist Republic of Croatia

1990s

1990: Republic of Croatia

1991: Republic of Croatia

Record per opponent 

Only official matches are displayed.

External links 

 Croatia  at FIFA.com
 Croatian Football Statistics

1940s in Croatia
1950s in Croatia
1990s in Croatia
1940-91